95.8 FM is the second programme of the ERT3 radio service.

History 
The station commenced its operation in February 1994, with the encouragement of then Minister of Culture Melina Mercouri, succeeding the local ERT1 (former NRTF) radio station which, until 1994, was broadcast only on medium wave, and was since then transformed to 95.8 FM with a cultural and recreational orientation.

In August 2011, the Papandreou government decided to merge the -then- three ERT3 radio stations (102 FM, 95.8 & Trito Programma Vrahea), something that was eventually averted, following negative reactions.

Following ERT's shutdown in June 2013, it ceased broadcasting. It resumed broadcasting on June 11, 2015. Until August 30, 2015, it broadcast the same programme with 102 FM.

References 

Mass media in Thessaloniki
Radio stations in Greece
Hellenic Radio